Darricau is a French surname. Notable people with the surname include:

 Henri Darricau (born 1955), Lebanese fencer
 Jean Darricau (born 1931), French rugby player
 Yves Daniel Darricau (born 1953), Lebanese fencer
 Darry Cowl, born André Darricau

French-language surnames